Droplaugarsona saga  is one of the Icelanders' sagas, probably written in the 13th century. 
The saga takes place near Lagarfljót in the east of Iceland  about 1000 AD. 

It tells the story of Grim (Grímr) and Helge (Helgi), sons of the widow Droplaug, as grown men.  Helge is killed by   Helge Åsbjørnsson (Helgi Ásbjarnarson). Grim avenges his brother's death by killing Åsbjørnsson. These are the same brothers who also appear in Fljótsdæla saga. Some of the storyline of Droplaugarsona saga overlaps with that of Fljótsdæla saga, although details often differ.

References

External links
Full text and translations at the Icelandic Saga Database
Proverbs in Droplaugarsona saga

Sagas of Icelanders